The Broader Options for Americans Act (H. R. 2579) is a bill introduced in the United States House of Representatives in 2017. The bill is sponsored by U.S. Representative Pat Tiberi (R–OH) and enables selected individuals who lose their jobs to use tax credits offered under the American Health Care Act to receive continued coverage under their employer sponsored health insurance plans. This bill has no effect until the American Health Care Act of 2017 is enacted into law.

In February 2018, this bill was used as the vehicle for immigration legislation which was debated in the United States Senate. The immigration legislation aimed to resolve the status of undocumented immigrants, who were protected under the Deferred Action for Childhood Arrivals program after the program was rescinded by the Trump administration. The legislation would also introduce additional immigration reforms. This bill allowed senators to offer amendments and compete for 60 votes to pass the Senate.

Amendments voted on in the Senate
Below is a list of amendments to this bill with actions taken in the Senate during the immigration debate. All of the amendments mentioned below failed to advance.

References

Proposed legislation of the 115th United States Congress
United States proposed federal immigration and nationality legislation